Pseudolinguistic may mean
imitating some qualities of language
an early stage in language acquisition ("babbling")
Glossolalia
a toy model in language modelling
linguistic pseudo-scholarship
Pseudoscientific language comparison
Phaistos Disc decipherment claims
Sun Language Theory
Lemurian Tamil
Folk linguistics